Matt Viator (born September 3, 1963) is an American football coach. He served as the head football coach at McNeese State University from 2006 to 2015 and the University of Louisiana at Monroe from 2016 to 2020. Viator began his coaching career in 1986 as a high school assistant coach, before leading several high schools in southwestern Louisiana as a head coach. He moved to the college ranks at McNeese State in 1999 and was elevated to head coach four games into the 2006 season after the firing of Tommy Tate.

Coaching career

High school
Viator led Jennings High School to a Louisiana Class 3A State Championship in 1992, the school's first, and only, state title since 1939.

Head coaching record

College

References

External links
 Louisiana profile
 Louisiana–Monroe profile

1963 births
Living people
Louisiana Ragin' Cajuns football coaches
Louisiana–Monroe Warhawks football coaches
McNeese Cowboys football coaches
High school football coaches in Louisiana
McNeese State University alumni